is a cape located in the Kii Peninsula in Shima, Mie in Japan.

The lighthouse 
The lighthouse of Cape Daiō was built in 1927. It was damaged by aerial bombardment during the Pacific War (1941-1945) and by the passage of Typhoon Vera in 1959. The limestone structure visible in 2015 is a renovated version of the original dating back to 1978.

References 

Daio
Landforms of Mie Prefecture